Birutė Vėsaitė (born 19 August 1951) is a Lithuanian politician.

Life
She was born in 1951.

She is a member of the Lithuanian Social Democratic Party. In 2012 she was appointed to be a Government Minister of the Economy. She was replaced in May 2013.

References

1951 births
Living people
Women government ministers of Lithuania
Politicians from Kaunas
Women members of the Seimas
Ministers of Economy of Lithuania
21st-century Lithuanian politicians
21st-century Lithuanian women politicians
Members of the Seimas